Dove is an espionage program by the Chinese government to spy using unmanned drones which are designed like birds.

References 

Espionage in China